Calpine Corporation is the largest generator of electricity from natural gas and geothermal resources in the United States, with operations in competitive power markets.

A Fortune 500 company based in Houston, Texas, the company is owned by an affiliate of Energy Capital Partners and a consortium of other investors, including Access Industries Inc. and Canada Pension Plan Investment Board.

Operations
Through wholesale power operations and its retail businesses, Calpine serves customers in 24 states, Canada, and Mexico.

Its fleet of 80 power plants in operation or under construction represents nearly 26,035 megawatts of generation capacity. In 2019, it reported generating 100.8 megawatt hours of electricity, 5% more than in 2018.

History

In response to the 1973 oil crisis and the 1979 energy crisis, much legislation was passed that made domestic energy production an attractive enterprise.  

In 1984, Calpine was founded in Silicon Valley, California. Peter Cartwright and four of his co-workers, the Guy F. Atkinson Construction Company of South San Francisco, and the Electrowatt corporation struck an investment arrangement. With initial capital of US$1 million, it was essentially a Silicon Valley startup company. In 1988, the first QF cogeneration plant was commissioned and power production began. In 1996, the company's initial public offering (IPO) was the largest for an independent energy company. 

The name "Calpine" is derived from the company's original California location and alpine, a reference to the Zürich home base of Electrowatt. Calpine is the largest generator of electricity from natural gas and geothermal resources in the United States.

Its grouping of 19 powerplants located in geothermal field outside Sonoma, CA, often referred to as "The Geysers,"  is the largest producer of renewable geothermal power in North America, producing 725 megawatts of electricity, enough to power 725,000 homes or a city the size of San Francisco. Despite the name of the steam field no natural geysers exist near The Geysers - Clear Lake area.

Timeline 
 1984: provider of management services for independent energy companies
 1988: first power production
 1992: assets of US$21 billion
 1994: 141 MW capacity
 1996: largest IPO ever for an independent energy company
 1998: purchased 45 gas turbine power plants
 1999: purchased 18 gas turbine power plants
 1999: acquired PG&E's plants at The Geysers, making Calpine the world's largest geothermal provider 
 2001: the California electricity crisis
 2004: Investment bank Lehman Brothers begins shorting Calpine, with researcher Christine Daley lacking confidence in Calpine. This information spreads to clients of Lehman. By the time Calpine goes bankrupt in 2005, Lehman will profit roughly $100,000,000 from the short.
 2005: November: CEO Peter Cartwright and CFO Bob Kelly leave the company.      
 2005: December 20: Calpine files bankruptcy, US$22 billion in debt. Calpine's aggressive leveraged expansion plan was unsupportable in the economic environment formed by the 2000-2001 California energy crisis and the collapse of Enron.  Stock price dropped to less than US$0.30 per share. Delisted from NYSE.
 2008: On 1/31/08, Calpine emerges from bankruptcy. Previous stock was exchanged for warrants. New Calpine stock began trading on the NYSE under the ticker symbol "CPN."
 2008: Executive leadership team headed by president and CEO Jack Fusco join the company.
 2009: Moved corporate headquarters from San Jose, California to Houston, Texas.
 2010: Acquired Conectiv Energy (generation) from Pepco Holdings.
 2010: Calpine dedicates the Geothermal Visitor Center and celebrates 50 years of geothermal power production at The Geysers in Northern California.
 2010: Thad Hill is named chief operating officer.
 2012: Calpine's power plant fleet generates a record 116 million MWh of electricity.
 2013: Calpine rings the opening bell at the New York Stock Exchange on January 18.
 2014: Jack Fusco becomes Calpine's executive chairman of the board and Thad Hill becomes the company's chief executive officer effective May 21.
 2014: Calpine executes on a strategic priority by selling six power plants in its Southeast region.
 2015: Calpine acquired award-winning retail electric provider Champion Energy, expanding customer channels in its core Texas and Northeastern U.S. markets. 
 2016: Calpine acquired Granite Ridge Energy Center in Londonderry, New Hampshire.
 2016: Frank Cassidy becomes chairman of the board.
 2016: Calpine acquires Noble Group Ltd's North American energy business.
 2018: Calpine is acquired by an affiliate of Energy Capital Partners and a consortium of other investors, including Access Industries Inc. and Canada Pension Plan Investment Board, on March 8. A new board is named. Shares of Calpine's common stock stop trading prior to the March 9, 2018, opening of the New York Stock Exchange.

See also 

 The Geysers

References

 Editors, Scientific American (2004). The 2004 Scientific American 50 Award: Business Leaders. Retrieved February 7, 2006.
 Editors, World-Generation. Peter Cartwright. Retrieved February 10, 2006.
 Peters, Sara (2002). Calpine CEO shares wisdom, insight. Retrieved February 10, 2006.
 
 Schlager, Neil (2006). Peter Cartwright, 1930-. Retrieved February 10, 2006.
 Green, Sherri (2016). http://www.calpine.com/. Revised July 17, 2019.
1984 establishments in Texas
American companies established in 1984
Companies based in Houston
Energy companies established in 1984
Electric power companies of the United States
Geothermal energy in North America
Non-renewable resource companies established in 1984